The People's Action Party is a right-of-centre political party in Papua New Guinea.

It was founded prior to the 1987 election by former Opposition Leader Ted Diro.

At the 2002 election, the party won 5 out of 109 seats in total (with 5% of the vote in total). At the 2007 election, the party won 6 seats. It supported the government of Prime Minister Michael Somare.

In October 2011, four PAP MPs, including then-leader Gabriel Kapris, defected to the Papua New Guinea Party. The party won no seats at the 2012 election. In July 2012, the party was reported to have "disintegrated" following the Kapris defection.

The party has not received any media coverage since 2012; however, it had registered to contest the 2017 election.

References

Political parties in Papua New Guinea
1987 establishments in Papua New Guinea
Political parties established in 1987